Arkham Asylum is a fictional place in DC Comics comic books, commonly in stories featuring Batman. 

Arkham Asylum may also refer to:

Arkham Asylum: A Serious House on Serious Earth, a Batman graphic novel
Batman: Arkham Asylum, a video game
Arkham Asylum (rollercoaster), in Australia
Batman: Arkham Asylum (roller coaster), in Spain

See also

 Batman: Arkham, a series of video games
 Gotham City Gauntlet: Escape from Arkham Asylum, a rollercoaster in the U.S.